2009 World University Games may refer to:

2009 Summer Universiade, held in Belgrade, Serbia
2009 Winter Universiade, held in Harbin, China